The Congress Building, or simply the Congress Building, is a historic skyscraper in Downtown Miami, Florida, United States. It is located at the address of 111 Northeast 2nd Avenue. The Congress Building was added to the National Register of Historic Places on March 14, 1985, and is locally identified a historic site in the Downtown Miami Development of Regional Impact (DRI). The Congress Building was formerly office space until 1999, when it was restored and converted to apartments. At street level, the building contains retail space which is leased to a number of stores and services including a financial establishment, The Loft condo sales center, beauty salon and café. Originally the building was five stories; the additional 16 were added on later.

References

External links

 

 
Related Group - The Congress Building
Dade County listings - National Register of Historic Places
Emporis - Congress Building

Buildings and structures completed in 1923
Office buildings completed in 1926
Residential skyscrapers in Miami
National Register of Historic Places in Miami
Mediterranean Revival architecture in Florida
Chicago school architecture in Florida
1923 establishments in Florida